Rustam Khaidaraliyev (born 21 April 1971) is a former Tajikistani football player.

Honours
Regar-TadAZ Tursunzoda
Tajik League runner-up: 1992
Tajik Cup finalist: 1992

Varzob
Tajik League champion: 1999
Tajik Cup winner: 1999

Hima Dushanbe
Tajik League runner-up: 2006
Tajik Cup finalist: 2006, 2007

References

External links

1971 births
Living people
Soviet footballers
Tajikistani footballers
Tajikistan international footballers
FC Vorskla Poltava players
Tajikistani expatriate footballers
Expatriate footballers in Ukraine
FC Shakhtar Makiivka players
FC Hirnyk-Sport Horishni Plavni players
FC Lokomotiv Nizhny Novgorod players
Expatriate footballers in Russia
Russian Premier League players
FC Shakhter Karagandy players
Expatriate footballers in Kazakhstan
Tajikistani expatriate sportspeople in Kazakhstan
Tajikistani expatriate sportspeople in Russia
Tajikistani expatriate sportspeople in Ukraine
FC Aktobe players
FC Taraz players
Kazakhstan Premier League players
Association football midfielders
Association football defenders
Footballers at the 1998 Asian Games
Asian Games competitors for Tajikistan
FC Volga Ulyanovsk players